Men, Women: A User's Manual is a 1996 French film directed by Claude Lelouch.

Cast
 Fabrice Luchini - Fabio Lini
 Bernard Tapie - Benoit Blanc
 Alessandra Martines - Doctor Nitez
 Pierre Arditi - Lerner
 Ticky Holgado - Toc Toc, Loulou's father
 Agnès Soral - Fabio Lini's girlfriend
 Ophélie Winter - Pretty Blonde of Crillon
 Patrick Husson - Falsetto singer (voice)
 Salomé Lelouch - Lola Dufour (credited as Salomé)
 Christophe Hémon - Loulou, boy from train
 William Leymergie - Dufour
 Caroline Cellier - Madame Blanc
 Gisèle Casadesus - Clara Blanc, Benoit's mother
 Daniel Gélin - The widower
 Anouk Aimée - The widow
 Philippe Khorsand - Restaurant chief
 Ginette Garcin
 Antoine Duléry
 Julien Courbey

References

External links
 

French comedy-drama films
1996 films
Films directed by Claude Lelouch
Films scored by Francis Lai
1990s French films